El'ad is a city in the Center District of Israel.

Elad may also refer to:

In organizations:
El-Ad Group, a real estate development conglomerate based in Israel
 Elad Properties, its New York City-based subsidiary
El'ad Association or Ir David Foundation, an Israeli archaeology, tourism and settlement organization 

In people:
Elad Gabai (born 1985), Israeli footballer
Elad Lassry (born 1977), American artist
Elad Manor, Israeli musician, member of the band The Fading
Elad Peled (1927–2021), Israeli general
Michael Elad, Israeli engineer

See also
Ellada, transliteration of the Greek name for the country of Greece in Southern Europe